Dame Susan Ilene Rice, Lady Rice,  (née Wunsch; born 7 March 1946) is a British banker and head of the Scottish Fiscal Commission. In 2000 she became the first female leader of a British clearing bank. She is the chair of Scottish Water and a member of the Banking Standards Board.

Early life
Susan Ilene Wunsch was born on 7 March 1946 and grew up in Rhode Island, in the United States. She studied biology and philosophy of science at Wellesley College, Massachusetts, United States, graduating in 1967 with a Bachelor of Arts.

At Wellesley she met Scottish historian Duncan Rice; they married shortly after her graduation and they moved to Scotland together. She then studied philosophy of science at University of Aberdeen, gaining a Master of Letters in 1970. Rice and her husband returned to the United States. She initially became a medical researcher then an administrator in molecular biology Saybrook College at Yale.

She was the Dean of Saybrook College, Yale University (1978–80). In 1981, she moved to upstate New York and she worked as Dean of Students at Colgate University.

Banking
In 1986, she began working for NatWest Bancorp, where she managed a successful community development programme. In 1996, her husband was appointed as Vice-Chancellor at the University of Aberdeen and they moved back to Scotland. She joined the Bank of Scotland in 1997.

In September 2000 she was appointed as chief executive of Lloyds TSB Scotland and so become the first woman to lead a British clearing bank. In May 2008 took on the role of chairman in addition to this. When the Lloyds Banking Group was created by takeover of HBOS that year, Rice was appointed as managing director of Scottish part of the group. Rice retired from this position in December 2014.

She became a non-executive director at Scottish and Southern Energy plc (SSE) in 2003, then took the position of senior independent director in 2007. In 2011, she became a member of the Council of Economic Advisers. In 2012, she became the first woman to be appointed president of the Scottish Council for Development and Industry. In May 2013, she became a non-executive director of Sainsbury's supermarket chain. In March 2015 it was announced that she had been appointed the chair of Scottish Water, taking up the post on 1 June 2015.

She was a member of the court of the Bank of England, first appointed in 2007, reappointed in 2009, serving until June 2014.

She chairs the Chartered Banker Professional Standards Board (CB:PSB), a voluntary initiative supported by nine leading banks in the UK, which was established in October 2011. In April 2015, she was also appointed as a non-practitioner member of the Banking Standards Board.

Cultural roles
She was chair of the Edinburgh International Book Festival from 2001 to October 2015.

In 2008, the Edinburgh Festivals Forum was formed as a commission with strategic development role, appointing Rice as chair. In June 2015, it was announced that she was to become the chair of Scotland's 2020 Climate Group, having been vice-chair of the group since it was formed in 2009.

She is a Regent of the Royal College of Surgeons of Edinburgh.

Honours
In 2002 she was elected a Fellow of the Royal Society of Edinburgh (FRSE), and a Fellow of the Royal Society of Arts (FRSA) in 2004.

Rice was appointed a Commander of the Order of the British Empire (CBE) for services to banking in the 2005 New Year Honours and elevated to Dame Commander of the Order of the British Empire in the 2018 New Year Honours.

In 2005 she became Prince Charles's Ambassador for Corporate Social Responsibility in Scotland. She received the inaugural Leadership Award at the National Business Awards Scotland 2007.

She has several honorary degrees, including University of Glasgow, a Doctor of Business Administration from Queen Margaret University in 2008.

In November 2013 she received a lifetime achievement award at the Vision in Business for the Environment of Scotland Awards (Vibes).

References

External links
 Profile at Scottish Fiscal Commission

Living people
1946 births
Wellesley College alumni
Alumni of the University of Aberdeen
Lloyds Banking Group people
Yale University faculty
Colgate University faculty
Dames Commander of the Order of the British Empire
Fellows of the Royal Society of Edinburgh
Businesspeople from Rhode Island
American emigrants to the United Kingdom
Naturalised citizens of the United Kingdom
Wives of knights